Raymond Hansen (9 February 1914 – 20 October 1995) was a Danish footballer. He played in one match for the Denmark national football team in 1935.

References

External links
 

1914 births
1995 deaths
Danish men's footballers
Denmark international footballers
Place of birth missing
Association footballers not categorized by position